Paris 92 is a French handball club from Paris. This team currently competes in the French Women's Handball First League from 2010. The club was previously named Issy-les-Moulineaux Handball (1999-2009) and Issy Paris Hand (2009-2018).

Results
French Women's First League Championship:
Runner-up (4): 2012, 2014, 2015, 2017
French Women's Cup Championship:
Runner-up (1) : 2014
1/2 Finalist (2) : 2009, 2010
1/4 Finalist (2) : 2013, 2016
1/8 Finalist (2) :2011, 2015
French Women's League Cup Championship:
Winners (1): 2013
Runner-up (5) : 2008, 2009, 
1/2 Finalist (3) : 2014, 2015, 2016
1/4 Finalist (1) : 2012
European Women's EHF Cup:
1/4 Finalist (1) : 2009
European Women's EHF Cup Winners' Cup:
Runner-up (1): 2013
1/2 Finalist (1): 2015
European Women's EHF Challenge Cup:
Runner-up (1): 2014

Team

Current squad
Squad for the 2022–23 season

 
Goalkeepers
 1  Roxanne Franck
 16  Léa Serdarević 

Wingers
LW
 10  Aminata Cissokho	
 19  Alice Mazens
RW
 21  Amélie Dufeil
 23  Candy Jabateh
 28  Namizata Fofana
Line players
 9  Astride Ngouan
 92  Adja Ouattara

Back players
LB
 27  Lara Gonzalez Ortega
 29  Gnonsiane Niombla
CB
 17  Coura Kanouté
 22  Déborah Lassource
 25  Méline Nocandy 
RB
 18  Jannela Blonbou
 20  Laura Flippes

Transfers
Transfers for the 2023–24 season
 

Joining 
  Marie Prouvensier (RW) (from  OGC Nice Côte d'Azur Handball) 
  Adrianna Płaczek (GK) (from  Neptunes de Nantes) 
  Barbara Moretto (RB) (from  Neptunes de Nantes) 

Leaving
  Laura Flippes (RB) (to  CSM București) 
  Gnonsiane Niombla (LB/CB) (to  CS Gloria Bistrița-Năsăud)  
  Lara Gonzalez Ortega (LB) (to  CS Rapid București)

Notable players 

  Armelle Attingré (2009-2016)
  Paule Baudouin (2006-2008)
  Lesly Briemant (2010-2015)
  Audrey Bruneau (2008-2012)
  Doungou Camara (2012-2017)
  Cléopâtre Darleux (2007-2009)
  Siraba Dembélé (2008-2009)
  Audrey Deroin (2004-2009)
  Amélie Goudjo (2007-2008, 2010-2014)
  Sophie Herbrecht (2006-2009)
  Stella Joseph-Mathieu (2000-2003)
  Coralie Lassource (2008-2017)
  Astride N'Gouan (2010-2014)
  Allison Pineau (2006-2009, 2019-2020)
  Marie-Audrey Sababady (2005-2011)
  Mariama Signaté (2011-2014)
  Angélique Spincer (2006-2015)
  Melvine Deba (2015-2020)
  Océane Sercien-Ugolin (2018-2020)
  Chloé Bulleux (2017-2019)
  Kalidiatou Niakaté (2011-2017)
  Tamara Horacek (2017-2020)
  Catherine Gabriel (2020-2022)
  Marie-Hélène Sajka (2021-2022)
  Hanna Bredal Oftedal (2014-2019)
  Stine Bredal Oftedal (2013-2017)
  Silje Solberg (2016-2018) 
  Pernille Wibe (2013-2017)
  Karoline Lund (2021)
  Charlotte Mordal (2010-2014)
  Ulrika Toft Hansen (2019-2020)
  Frida Tegstedt (2016-2017)
  Jasna Tošković (2012-2013)
  Marija Jovanović (2014-2016)
  Lucie Satrapová (2018-2020)
  Veronika Malá (2017-2021)
  Lois Abbingh (2016-2018)
  Nadia Offendal (2020-2022)
  Mayssa Pessoa (2011-2012)
  Krisztina Pigniczki (2008-2011)
  Karolina Zalewska (2008-2017)
  Crina Pintea (2017-2019)
  Sonja Frey (2017-2019)
  Ryu Eun-hee (2019-2020)
  Ruth João (2022)

Arena 
Name: Palais des Sports Robert-Charpentier
City: Issy-les-Moulineaux, Paris
Capacity: 1,500 seats
Address:  6 Boulevard des Frères Voisin, 92130 Issy-les-Moulineaux

Name: Stade Pierre-de-Coubertin
City: Boulogne-Billancourt, Paris
Capacity: 4,020 seats
Address:  82 Avenue Georges Lafont, 75016 Paris

References

External links
 

French handball clubs
Sports clubs in Paris